Uyuni Airport , also known as Joya Andina Airport, is an airport at extremely high elevation just northwest of Uyuni, in the southwestern Potosí Department of Bolivia. It is close to the Salar de Uyuni, the world's largest salt flat. It was opened by the Bolivian president Evo Morales on July 11, 2011. Currently the airport is served by one airline:  Boliviana de Aviacion which offers regular flights to and from La Paz and Cochabamba.

The Uyuni VOR-DME (Ident: UNI) is located on the field.

Airlines and destinations

See also

Transport in Bolivia
List of airports in Bolivia

References

External links 
Joya Andina Airport at OpenStreetMap
Uyuni Airport at OurAirports

Uyuni Joya Andina Airport at FlightRadar24

Airports in Potosí Department